Admiral Sir Thomas Hugh Binney,  (9 December 1883 – 8 January 1953) was a senior officer in the Royal Navy and the 16th Governor of Tasmania from 1945 to 1951.

Early life
Binney was born in Douglas, Isle of Man on 9 December 1883, the son of Thomas Godfrey Binney and his wife, Susan Lockhart.

Naval career
Binney was determined to pursue a career with the Royal Navy from an early age, and he joined the training vessel HMS Britannia at Dartmouth at the age of 13.

He served at sea from 1899 until 1914, and was then aboard  as a gunnery officer for the Dardanelles Campaign. Binney had been promoted to the rank of Commander by 1916, and was awarded the Distinguished Service Order in 1919. He was made Captain whilst on the China Station in 1922. He became deputy director of plans at the Admiralty in 1925.

Promoted to Rear Admiral in 1934, he became commander of the 1st Battle Squadron, Mediterranean Fleet in 1936. When the Second World War broke out, he was Commandant of the Imperial Defence College in London. He became Flag Officer, Orkneys and Shetlands in December 1939 and was promoted to admiral in 1942. He then served as flag officer-in-charge, in Cardiff before retiring from the navy in 1944.

Governor of Tasmania
Following his retirement from the navy, Hugh Binney was chosen to replace Ernest Clark as Governor of Tasmania, a post he took up on 24 December 1945. He excelled at the post, and was a popular governor. Despite this, his governorship was not a quiet one. He oversaw the Robert Cosgrove government forced to call an early election in 1948 due to the Legislative Council rejecting the supply bill. He again dissolved the second Cosgrove government in 1950 due to the retirement of speaker of the house, W.G. Wedd, in protest at the appointment of Thomas D'Alton as Agent General for Tasmania.

The Binneys both engaged themselves in the Tasmanian way of life, and were both involved in many social organisations. Hugh Binney was a member of the Royal Yacht Club of Tasmania, and won the Derwent Sailing Pennant in 1951. He retired as governor on 8 May 1951 and immediately returned to England.

Later life
Hugh Binney was made a Companion of the Order of the Bath (CB) in 1935, and was elevated to Knight Commander of the Order of the Bath (KCB) in 1940. He married Elizabeth Bride Blair-Imrie, a granddaughter of Brigadier General Eyre Macdonell Stewart Crabbe, at the parish church of St Martin-in-the-Fields, London on 31 October 1942, but they were never to have children. She excelled in the role of governor's wife. Sir Hugh Binney was elevated to Knight Commander of the Order of St Michael and St George in 1951, and following surgery for cholecystitis, he died of pulmonary embolism on 8 January 1953.

His grave lies in the churchyard of St Mary the Virgin, Tollesbury, Essex.

References

External links
 Royal Navy (RN) Officers 1939–1945

 

|-

|-

1883 births
1953 deaths
Burials in Essex
Royal Navy admirals
Companions of the Distinguished Service Order
Deaths from pulmonary embolism
Governors of Tasmania
Knights Commander of the Order of St Michael and St George
Knights Commander of the Order of the Bath
People from Douglas, Isle of Man
Royal Navy admirals of World War II
Royal Navy officers of World War I